The Hardey River is a river in the Pilbara region of Western Australia.

The headwaters of the river rise at Tom Price in the Hamersley Range and flow in a westerly direction. The river travels almost parallel with the Nanutarra-Wittenoom Road until it discharges into the Ashburton River near Hardey Junction.

The Hardey River has two tributaries; the Beasley River and Hope Creek.

The river was named in 1861 during an expedition by explorer Francis Gregory, after Swan River colonist John Wall Hardey, who was a family friend. Gregory had previously named the nearby Mount Wall after Hardey.

References

Rivers of the Pilbara region